47 Aquarii, abbreviated 47 Aqr, is a star in the zodiac constellation of Aquarius. 47 Aquarii is its Flamsteed designation. It is a faint star but visible to the naked eye in good seeing conditions, having an apparent visual magnitude of 5.135. At that distance, the visual magnitude of the star is diminished by an extinction of 0.088 due to interstellar dust. It is moving further from the Earth with a heliocentric radial velocity of +48 km/s.

This is an evolved giant star currently on the red giant branch with a stellar classification of K0 III. The star has 1.35 times the mass of the Sun and has expanded to 7.86 times the Sun's radius. It is radiating 30 times the Sun's luminosity from its enlarged photosphere at an effective temperature of 4,750 K.

References

K-type giants
Aquarius (constellation)
Durchmusterung objects
Aquarii, 047
212010
110391
8516